Peter Meyer Kass (April 28, 1923 – 4 August 2008) was an American theater actor and director who became a well-known teacher. His mentor Clifford Odets chose Kass to direct and develop The Country Girl before it opened on Broadway. Kass played the part of Larry.

Kass later directed four Broadway plays, including a   short-lived revival of Odets' Night Music and  Lorraine Hansberry's The Sign in Sidney Brustein's Window, and he directed for television on Assignment: Manhunt and for films, including Time of the Heathen.

Kass taught at Boston University in the 1950s, then at New York University in the 1960s and 1970s before becoming a private instructor. Students included Olympia Dukakis, Faye Dunaway, John Cazale, Maureen Stapleton and Val Kilmer.

Kass was born in Brooklyn and was a lifelong resident. He died of heart failure in Manhattan.

References

External links

American male actors
1923 births
2008 deaths
People from Brooklyn
Boston University faculty
New York University faculty